Jean-Paul Anton (born 30 April 1948) is a French boxer. He competed in the men's featherweight event at the 1968 Summer Olympics. At the 1968 Summer Olympics, he lost to Philip Waruinge of Kenya.

References

1948 births
Living people
Featherweight boxers
French male boxers
Olympic boxers of France
Boxers at the 1968 Summer Olympics
Pieds-Noirs
Sportspeople from Oran